John Bury may refer to:

John Bury (English politician) (by 1478–1522/23), MP for Cambridge (UK Parliament constituency)
John Bury (Irish politician) (by 1715), MP for Askeaton (Parliament of Ireland constituency)
John Bury (translator) (1535–1571), English translator
John Bury (divine) (1580–1667), English divine
John Bury (captain) (1915–2006), master mariner
John Bury (theatre designer) (1925–2000), British theatre designer
J. B. Bury (1861–1927), John Bagnell Bury, Irish historian
John Bury (priest) (fl. 1430s–1470s) Canon of Windsor

See also
John Barry (disambiguation)
John Berry (disambiguation)